The Linton Formation is a geologic formation in Indiana. It is the lower formation in the Carbondale Group, and includes six named members, "which, in ascending order, are the Seelyville Coal, Coxville Sandstone, Colchester Coal, Mecca Quarry Shale, Velpen Limestone, and Survant Coal Members, and unnamed units of sandstone, shale, and clay".

It preserves fossils dating back to the Carboniferous period.

The Linton Formation was first named on a United States Geological Survey coal investigations map in 1950. The type locality is along the tributaries of Lattas Creek, approximately 4 miles north of Linton, Greene County, Indiana.

See also
 List of fossiliferous stratigraphic units in Indiana

References

 

Carboniferous Indiana
Carboniferous Illinois
Carboniferous southern paleotropical deposits